Epinotia canthonias is a moth of the family Tortricidae first described by Edward Meyrick in 1920. It is found in Sri Lanka and the Bengal region of India.

Larval food plants are Ficus glomerata and the leaves, flowers and shoots of Loranthus species.

References

Moths of Asia
Moths described in 1920